Canadian checkers (or Canadian draughts) is a variant of the  strategy board game draughts. It is one of the largest draughts games, played on a 12×12 checkered board with 30 game pieces per player.

History
The game was invented by the French settlers of Quebec, Canada; it was named Grand jeu de dames. It is unknown when the game was first played in Canada. The huff rule was dropped in 1880 after a dispute developed during the Canadian championship match.

The idea of an increased-size international draughts game is older still; boards with 12×12 squares were on sale in London in 1805.

Game rules

Canadian checkers follows the same rules and conventions as international draughts, the only differences are the larger gameboard (12×12 squares instead of 10×10), and more checkers per player (30 instead of 20). The starting setup is shown in the diagram.

Notation

Games are recorded using the same method of notation used by other draughts variants, extended for a board of 144 squares (see diagram).

See also
 Hexdame – international draughts rules applied to a hexagonal board

References

Bibliography

External links
Association Québécoise des joueurs de dames (AQJD) official site of the Quebec draughts association 

Canadian board games
Abstract strategy games
Draughts variants
Canadian inventions